Picpus (derived from French pique-puce = flea-bite) may refer to:

 Picpus, Paris, a quarter and administrative area centered on the Rue de Picpus in the 12th arrondissement of Paris, France
 Picpus (Paris Métro), a station on line 6 of the Paris Metro
 Picpus Cemetery, a cemetery in Paris
 Picpus Fathers, an order of the Catholic Church, officially the Congregation of the Sacred Hearts of Jesus and Mary, originating from Picpus, Paris
 Picpus (film), a 1943 film by Richard Pottier